Tanhouse Lane railway station is a closed station on the former Sheffield and Midland Railway Companies' Committee line, which formed a loop off the Cheshire Lines Committee (CLC) line in the Widnes area between  and . It was opened on 1 September 1890 as "Tanhouse", being changed later to "Tanhouse Lane". It closed on 5 October 1964.

In 1922 13 "Down" (towards Liverpool) trains called on "Week Days" (Mondays to Saturdays). Eight ran from Warrington Central, two from Manchester Central and two started at Tanhouse Lane itself, all headed for Liverpool Central. "Up" services were similar.

The station was situated in an industrial area and was popular with workers travelling to and from it. With the rise in the use of the motor car, the station was nominated for closure in the Beeching Report. The final services ran on 3 October 1964, with the first service of the morning to terminate at Tanhouse Lane being a workmen's train; and the station closed from 5 October 1964. The goods yard remained in use until the late 1990s to serve the Blue Circle cement facility on Tanhouse Lane. The area fell into dereliction until a short section of the former Widnes Loop was converted into a heritage feature. A short section of a wall from the station can still be seen.

References

Sources

External links
Tanhouse Lane station on a navigable 1946 O.S. map
Tanhouse Lane station via Disused Stations UK
Widnes Loop via 8D Association

Disused railway stations in the Borough of Halton
Former Great Central and Midland Joint Railway stations
Railway stations in Great Britain opened in 1890
Railway stations in Great Britain closed in 1964
Beeching closures in England